Nina Stojanović was the defending champion but chose to compete at the 2020 Summer Olympics instead.

Lucky loser Elina Avanesyan won the title, defeating Federica Di Sarra in the final, 6–7(4–7), 6–2, 6–2.

Seeds

Draw

Finals

Top half

Bottom half

References

Main Draw

Reinert Open - Singles